Gals Panic was an Austin, Texas ska-punk band, formed in 1992. The band's name comes from the Kaneko arcade game of the same name.

Band history
The original lineup for Gals Panic consisted of vocalist Lance Fever (aka, Lance Myers), guitarist Jerm Pollet, and original bassist DJ Saturn playing along to a drum machine programmed by Mark Nineteen. It wasn't long before they found a real drummer, Steve Austin, to replace Mark Nineteen and the drum machine. DJ Saturn quit one year later and was replaced by Erik "the Butcher" Grostic, who played with the band for six months. Cardinal Connor joined the band in 1994, two weeks before their first US tour.  In 1995, the band self-released their debut, and only, full-length album, I Think We Need Helicopters, through Goopy Pyramid Records. The album features cover versions of "Superstar" and "We've Only Just Begun", two tracks previously recorded by The Carpenters.

The band's song "Gals Panic", was featured on the Skarmageddon compilation, released by Moon Ska Records, as well as the soundtrack for the Steven Soderbergh movie, The Underneath,  in which the band also makes an appearance.

The band parted ways amicably in 1997. They have since played four hometown reunion shows in Austin, Texas, the most recent one taking place at Emo's in 2010.

Post-breakup
Guitarist Jerm Pollet would form the pop-punk band Missile Command, before moving on to his solo project, Tall, Dark and Lonesome. He later became a member of The Total Foxes. Pollet has also performed music with actor Timothy "Speed" Levitch, under the name Ongoing Wow. When not performing music, he has served as tour manager for RuPaul and performs in the ComedySportz troupe and The Sinus Show. Lance Fever reunited with fellow Gals Panic band members Steve Austin and Cardinal Connor to form The Playdoh Squad who released their first album, Mutate, in 2000. Fever is the owner of Lance Fever Productions, an animation studio, and has worked on various music projects and films such as A Scanner Darkly, Prince of Egypt, Space Jam as well as programming on Adult Swim. He has supported his step-daughter, Ariel Abshire, also a musician, on stage. Connor lives in Atlanta, Georgia and continues to perform music. Steve Austin performs with Get Hip Records recording artists The UglyBeats. DJ Saturn moved on to play guitar in The Transgressors.

Discography
Space Race, 7" single (1993)
Airline Security Things, cassette (1994)
I Think We Need Helicopters, CD (1995)

References

External links
Gals Panic bandcamp page
Gals Panic Facebook page
A review of I Think We Need Helicopters from the Austin Chronicle, 1995

American ska punk musical groups